Viitivtsi is an urban-type settlement in Khmelnytskyi Raion (district) of Khmelnytskyi Oblast in western Ukraine. It hosts the administration of Viitivtsi settlement hromada, one of the hromadas of Ukraine. The settlement's population was 937 as of the 2001 Ukrainian Census and 

The settlement was founded in 1888 as the settlement of Podilske. It received the status of an urban-type settlement in 1970.

Until 18 July 2020, Viitivtsi belonged to Volochysk Raion. The raion was abolished in July 2020 as part of the administrative reform of Ukraine, which reduced the number of raions of Khmelnytskyi Oblast to three. The area of Volochysk Raion was merged into Khmelnytskyi Raion.

References

Urban-type settlements in Khmelnytskyi Raion
Populated places established in 1888
Podolia Voivodeship